Sir Thomas Southwell, 1st Baronet, of Castle Mattress (died 7 December 1680) was a high sheriff of County Kerry under the Protectorate.

Birth and origins 
Thomas was probably born at Castle Matrix, near Rathkeale, the fifth but only surviving son of Edmund Southwell and his wife Catherine Herbert. His father is called "Southwell of Castle Matrix". His grandfather, John Southwell of Barham, had come to Ireland from Suffolk during the reign of James I. His mother was a rich heiress, the only child of Garrett Herbert of Rathkeale.

Nothing seems to be known of the sisters he probably had.

Marriage and children 
Sir Thomas Southwell married Elizabeth Starkey, daughter of William Starkey. She would survive him and die in September 1688.

 
Thomas and Elizabeth had one son:
 Richard Southwell, who married Elizabeth daughter of Murrough O'Brien, 1st Earl of Inchiquin

—and three daughters:
 Garthruid, married John Piggot of Kilfinny as his first wife
 Margaret, married ___ Piggott
 Joan, married Sir William Oughtred Courtenay of Powderham in Devonshire, Baronet

Later life and death 
Southwell served as High Sheriff of Kerry, High Sheriff of Clare, and High Sheriff of County Limerick in 1654 under the Protectorate. On 4 August 1662 he was created 1st Baronet Southwell, of Castle Mattress in the Baronetage of Ireland, by Charles II. The castle mentioned in the territorial designation stands on the left bank of the River Deel, west of Rathkeale, and is also called Matrix or Matras.

Sir Thomas Southwell died in December 1680 or in May 1681 and was buried in Rathkeale. His eldest son, the member of parliament Richard Southwell, predeceased him and he was succeeded by his grandson Thomas, later 1st Baron, as the 2nd Baronet Southwell.

Notes and references

Notes

Citations

Sources 
 
  – 1649 to 1664
  – Scotland and Ireland
 
  – Viscounts, barons
 

1680 deaths
17th-century Anglo-Irish people
Baronets in the Baronetage of Ireland
High Sheriffs of Clare
High Sheriffs of County Limerick
High Sheriffs of Kerry
Year of birth unknown